In the United States, a class ring (also known as a graduation, graduate, senior, or grad ring) is a ring worn by students and alumni to commemorate their final academic year and/or graduation, generally for a high school, college, or university.

Today class rings can be customized, from the material and style that the ring is made of to the color and cut of the gem in the center. There is a wide selection of emblems, pictures, and words that can be added to the sides of the rings and even inside the center gem.

History 

The tradition of class rings originated with the class of 1835 at the United States Military Academy at West Point.

Wear
The "Complete Book of Etiquette" by Amy Vanderbilt indicates the following protocol for wearing of a class ring. For as long as the wearer is in school, the insignia should face the wearer to remind them of the goal of graduation. Upon graduation, the class ring gains the status of a "badge of honor" similar to a diploma, with the effect that graduation entitles the wearer to display the insignia facing outward so that it faces other viewers. An additional justification for this practice is the rationale that the ring also symbolizes the graduate themself:  during the wearer's time in school, they focus on self-development and goals specific to the insular academic environment; upon graduation, the wearer enters the wider world and puts what they have learned to work in shaping it.

A notable exception to this protocol is the custom followed by older graduating classes of the United States Military Academy at West Point. Today, as in years past, Academy graduates frequently wear their rings on the left hand in observance of the ancient belief, which also underlay the Anglo-American custom of wearing wedding bands on the left hand, that a vein connects the left ring finger to the heart. Prior to graduation, these classes wore the USMA Class Ring with the Class Crest closest to the heart, signifying a given cadet's bond to his class within the Academy.  Following graduation, members of these classes wore (and, for surviving members, still wear) the ring with the Academy Crest closest to the heart, signifying their bond with the Academy as a whole.

Ring melt 

Several institutions accept donated class rings from alumni for melting and incorporation into future class rings:

The Citadel
Massachusetts Institute of Technology
United States Air Force Academy
United States Coast Guard Academy
United States Merchant Marine Academy
United States Military Academy
United States Naval Academy

See also
 Doctoral ring
 Iron ring
 MIT class ring
 X-Ring
 Texas A&M ring
 United States Military Academy class ring

References

External links 

Rings (jewellery)
Academia
Education in the United States